The Oklahoma State University College of Engineering, Architecture, and Technology (or CEAT) serves as the engineering, architecture, and technology components of OSU-Stillwater in Stillwater, Oklahoma and OSU-Tulsa in Tulsa, Oklahoma. and is the only combined Engineering, Architecture, and Technology college in the United States. The Advanced Technology Research Center (ATRC), a relatively new addition to the college, has worked with business and industry in the areas of web handling, energy storage and conversion, manufacturing and other fields.

The OSU College of Engineering, Architecture, and Technology was created in 1902, and is the largest and oldest college of engineering in Oklahoma today and has frequently been recognized as one of the best colleges in the nation. Oklahoma State's architecture students have won more national and international competitions than any school in the country . Students in the School of Mechanical and Aerospace Engineering have won more American Institute of Aeronautics and Astronautics Design/Build/Fly competitions than any other school, finishing in the top 3 17 times since the competition's inception, including 7 first place wins. The Congressional Fire Services Institute, an institution advising Congress on fire and safety matters, named OSU's International Fire Service Training Association/Fire Protection Publications as the 2005 Fire Service Organization of the Year . Researchers at Oklahoma State have developed two new body armor systems, giving soldiers added protection against injuries to their arms and legs while on the battlefield .

Academic programs
 Aerospace Engineering
 Architecture
 Architectural Engineering
 Biosystems Engineering
 Chemical Engineering
 Civil Engineering
 Construction Engineering & Management
 Control Systems Engineering
 Electrical and Computer Engineering
 Electrical Engineering Technology
 Engineering and Technology Management
 Environmental Engineering
 Fire Protection and Safety Technology
 Geotechnical Engineering
 Health Care Administration
 Industrial Engineering and Management
 Mechanical Engineering
 Mechanical Engineering Technology
 Telecommunications management
 Transportation Engineering

External links
OSU College of Engineering, Architecture, and Technology
OSU Aerospace Design

College of Engineering, Architecture, and Technology
Engineering schools and colleges in the United States
Engineering universities and colleges in Oklahoma
Architecture schools in Oklahoma